The Gulf Coast campaign or the Spanish conquest of West Florida in the American Revolutionary War, was a series of military operations primarily directed by the governor of Spanish Louisiana, Bernardo de Gálvez, against the British province of West Florida. Begun  with operations against British positions on the Mississippi River shortly after Britain and Spain went to war in 1779, Gálvez completed the conquest of West Florida in 1781 with the successful siege of Pensacola.

Background
Spain officially entered the American Revolutionary War on 8 May 1779, with a formal declaration of war by King Charles III. This declaration was followed by another on 8 July that authorized his colonial subjects to engage in hostilities against the British. When Bernardo de Gálvez, the colonial Governor of Spanish Louisiana, received word of this on 21 July, he immediately began to secretly plan offensive operations. Gálvez, who had been planning for the possibility of war since April, intercepted communications from the British at Pensacola indicating that the British were planning a surprise attack on New Orleans; he decided to launch his own attack first. To that end, he concealed from the public his receipt of the second proclamation.

Control of the lower Mississippi

On 27 August Gálvez set out by land toward Baton Rouge, leading a force that consisted of 520 regulars (about two-thirds of them recent recruits), 60 militiamen, 80 free blacks and mulattoes, and ten Anglo-American volunteers headed by Oliver Pollock. As they marched upriver, the force grew by another 600 men, including Indians and Acadians. At its peak, the force numbered over 1,400; this number was reduced due to the hardships of the march, by several hundred, before they reached Fort Bute.

At dawn on 7 September this force attacked Fort Bute, a decaying relic of the French and Indian War that was defended by a token force. After a brief skirmish in which one German was killed, most of the garrison surrendered. The six who escaped capture made their way to Baton Rouge to notify the British troops there of the fort's capture.

After a few days' rest, Gálvez advanced on Baton Rouge, only  from Fort Bute.  When Gálvez arrived at Baton Rouge on 12 September, he found Fort New Richmond garrisoned by over 400 regular army troops and 150 militia, under the overall command of Lt. Colonel Alexander Dickson. After nine days' siege, Dickson surrendered.

Gálvez demanded and was granted terms that included the capitulation of the 80 Elite Grenadiers from the newly arrived 60th Regiment of Foote at Fort Panmure (modern Natchez, Mississippi), a well-fortified position which would have been difficult for Gálvez to take militarily. Dickson surrendered 375 regular troops the next day; Gálvez had Dickson's militia disarmed and sent home.  Gálvez then sent a detachment of 50 men to take control of Panmure. He dismissed his own militia companies, left a sizable garrison at Baton Rouge, and returned to New Orleans with about 50 men.

Mobile

In early 1780 Gálvez embarked on an expedition to capture Mobile, which was one of only two major British military establishments left in West Florida, the other being the capital, Pensacola.  Assembling 750 men at New Orleans, he sailed for Mobile on 11 January, reaching Mobile Bay on 9 February after being delayed by storms. He was joined on 20 February by a supporting force of 450 from Havana, but did not begin siege operations until the 1 March. After 14 days of bombardment, Fort Charlotte's walls were breached, and its commander, Captain Elias Durnford, surrendered.

Gálvez in the fall of 1780 sought to capture Pensacola, launching his naval force from Mobile, but the fleet was dispersed by a major hurricane. Its tattered remnants made their way back to either Havana or New Orleans, and planning began again for an expedition in 1781.

British authorities in Pensacola had, when war with Spain was imminent, attempted to shore up West Florida's defenses, but the meagre resources allocated to the region meant that General John Campbell, the military commander at Pensacola, had been able to do little to stop Gálvez's advance. By late 1780 he had received some reinforcements, and managed to recruit a significant force of local Indians to bolster Pensacola's defenses. The destruction of Gálvez's expedition emboldened him to attempt the recapture of Mobile. In January 1781 he dispatched more than 700 men under the command of the Waldecker Captain Johann von Hanxleden to go overland. This force was defeated when it attacked one of the forward Spanish defenses of Mobile, and Captain Hanxleden was killed. The attack prompted Spanish authorities in Cuba to enlarge the Mobile garrison.

Pensacola

Gálvez and Spanish authorities in Cuba again launched an expedition against Pensacola in February 1781. With forces that eventually numbered about 8,000, Gálvez, assisted by Spanish and French naval forces, first blockaded the Pensacola harbor, and then began siege operations on 9 March. By the 30 April the Spanish had successfully placed cannons that could fully attack the main Pensacola defenses. A lucky cannon shot hit the powder magazine in one of the outer defenses on 8 May, and the Spanish quickly capitalized upon this development by capturing the British position. Realizing his position was no longer tenable, Campbell opened surrender negotiations the next day. The terms of capitulation included all of the British West Florida.

References

Bibliography

See also
Battle of St. Louis, in Upper Louisiana (New Spain)
Bernardo de Gálvez
Spain in the American Revolutionary War

Anglo-Spanish War (1779–1783)
Military campaigns involving Spain
Military campaigns involving France
Military campaigns involving Great Britain
Military campaigns involving the United States
Conflicts in 1779
Conflicts in 1780
Conflicts in 1781
Louisiana in the American Revolution
Florida in the American Revolution
Spanish Florida
Former Spanish colonies
Pre-statehood history of Florida
Pre-statehood history of Louisiana
Pre-statehood history of Mississippi
Invasions by Spain